The Pyramids may refer to
Egyptian pyramids, especially the Pyramids at Giza
The Pyramids (band), a surf rock group from Long Beach, California
The Pyramids, a jazz ensemble led by musician Idris Ackamoor
The Pyramids (Indianapolis), buildings in Indianapolis
The Pyramids, a rock formation at Victory Beach, New Zealand
Former name of Symarip, a Jamaican reggae band
See also
Pyramid (disambiguation)